Marcella Mariani (Rome, Italy, 8 February 1936 – Monte Terminillo, Italy, 13 February 1955) was an Italian actress and Miss Italy contest winner. Though she appeared in several popular movies and was garnering acclaim as an actress, her career was cut short by her death in a 1955 airliner crash.

Biography
Having previously worked as a cashier at a cinema in Rome, 17-year-old Mariani was crowned Miss Italy of 1953 in the Tyrolean resort town of Cortina d'Ampezzo. After winning the pageant she began her career as a film actress, playing herself in the opening segment of producer/director Alfredo Guarini's portmanteau film We, the Women (1953). Although in demand due to her beauty, she was eager to improve her acting skills, and attended both the Experimental Center of Cinematography and acting school. She began taking on challenging roles and working with artistically adventurous directors.

Her most significant role was in director Luchino Visconti's 1954 film Senso, in which she worked alongside Alida Valli and Farley Granger, playing the small but important part of Clara, a young prostitute.

Her promising career was prematurely ended by her death in a plane crash, which occurred on the slopes of Monte Terminillo, in the province of Rieti, Italy, as she returned from hosting a film festival in Belgium. Traveling from Brussels to Rome, the DC-6 passenger liner crashed due to errors made by the crew in poor weather conditions. Heavy wind and snow prevented searchers from reaching the crash site for over a week. All 29 passengers and crew were believed to have died on impact. Mariani, who had turned 19 a few days earlier, was taken to Rome, where she was buried.

Filmography
Cavalcade of Song (1953, directed by Domenico Paolella)
We, the Women (a/k/a Of Life and Love) (1953, directed by Alfredo Guarini)
It Happened in the Park (1953, directed by Gianni Franciolini) as Marcella (uncredited)
Senso (1954, directed by Luchino Visconti) as Clara, la prostituta
If You Won a Hundred Million (1954, directed by Carlo Campogalliani and Carlo Moscovini) (uncredited)
Women and Soldiers (1954, directed by Luigi Malerba and Antonio Marchi)
The Mysterious Singer (1955, directed by Marino Girolami) as Marina
The Girls of San Frediano (1955, directed by Valerio Zurlini) as Gina
I'll Never Forget (1956, directed by Giuseppe Guarino) as Camilla (final film role)

References

External links

Italian female models
1936 births
1955 deaths
20th-century Italian actresses
Italian beauty pageant winners
Victims of aviation accidents or incidents in 1955